The Volunteer Corps for Korea was a Belgian–Luxembourg military force sent to assist South Korea during the Korean War. A battalion-sized unit, it arrived in Korea in 1951 and remained after the cease-fire until 1955. Over the course of its existence, 3,171 Belgians and 78 Luxembourgers served in the unit.

Background
Belgium, a country in Western Europe, became a signatory member of the United Nations (UN) in 1945 in the aftermath of World War II but had few pre-existing ties with East Asia. The Belgian Army operated a system of national service and already had sizeable commitments as part of the army of occupation in West Germany.

At the time the Korean War broke out in June 1950 the country was in the midst of a political crisis known as the Royal Question. This related to whether King Leopold III should be able to return to the throne after his actions in German-occupied Belgium in World War II but created a wider confrontation between left-leaning communist, socialist and trade-union circles which opposed the King's return and conservatives who supported it. The crisis brought the centre-right Christian Social Party to power although a compromise solution was found in August 1950 under which the King abdicated in favour of his son.

Prime Minister Joseph Pholien was opposed to the rise of communism abroad and wished to gain support from the United States. Both Belgian and Luxembourg governments decided to raise a volunteer-only formation to serve under UN command in the defence of South Korea.

Training
Over 2,000 Belgians volunteered for service in B.U.N.C. Of these, initially only 700 were selected for training at Leopoldsburg. After training, volunteers received their characteristic brown berets. Soldiers from Luxembourg who were trained alongside the Belgians were organised into 1st Platoon, A Company of B.U.N.C.

The Belgian-Luxembourg Corps sailed from Antwerp to Pusan and arrived on 31 January 1951. On arrival in Korea, some South Korean troops were made part of the Belgian contingent in order to bring the regiment up to correct battalion strength along the lines of the US "KATUSA" or Commonwealth "KATCOM" programme.

At the front

In April 1951, the Belgians fought in one of the key battles of the Korean War – the Battle of the Imjin River. The First Battalion was relieved by a new battalion fresh from Belgium in August 1951 which stayed until 1955.

At the Battle of the Imjin River in 1951, the Belgian battalion held a key pass alongside the British Gloucestershire Regiment. For actions at the Imjin, the Belgians received a US Presidential Citation. During the battle, Albert Crahay, commander of the unit, was wounded by a Chinese phosphorus shell and was evacuated to a hospital in Japan.

B.U.N.C. continued to see action and went on to earn further battle honours at Haktang-Ni – one of the series of battles at Broken Arrow – in October 1951 when the Belgians took up position on an isolated hillside and suffered relentless Chinese attacks which they successfully repelled, killing over a hundred Chinese and losing only a handful of men themselves.

The last main action fought by the Belgian contingent was at the Battle of Chatkol in April 1953. Belgian forces held a defensive arc position in the Iron Triangle for over 55 nights of Chinese assaults.

After the cease-fire, it was seen as unnecessary to keep BUNC up to the strength it had during the war and it was reduced to some 200 men on 30 December 1954, but, like other UN contingents, it was viewed as necessary to maintain a presence in Korea during the uncertain peace following the negotiations at Panmunjom and the last members of the unit finally left Korea on 15 June 1955.

Commanders

Belgian Commanders

Luxembourgish Commanders

"Belgians Can Do Too!"
BELGIANS CAN DO TOO! was a slogan written across the windshield of Padre of the Unit's (Padre Vander Goten) Jeep during the battles around the "Iron Triangle." Seeing the exhaustion of the troops, the Padre copied the motto of the US 15th Infantry Regiment ("Can Do") alongside whom the Belgians were serving at the time to try to raise morale. The phrase was made famous in Belgium and is thought to summarise the spirit and courage of the Belgian contingent.

Casualties
101 Belgian soldiers, 2 Luxembourgish soldiers and 9 South Korean soldiers attached to the Belgian contingent were killed during the war. 478 Belgians and 17 Luxembourgers were wounded in action and 5 Belgians are still posted as missing. 2 died in North Korean POW Camps.

Battle honours

B.U.N.C. was awarded two South Korean Presidential Unit Citations and one American Unit Citation.

The text of the US Presidential Unit Citation for actions at the Imjin River:

The Belgian-Luxembourg Corps served at three key battles of the Korean War – the Battle of the Imjin River and Battle of Haktang-ni 1951, and the Battle of Chatkol 1953.

Commemoration

The 3rd Parachute Battalion maintains the traditions (including the flag and badge) of BUNC and is based in Tielen.

Museums
 The National Museum of Military History in Diekirch, Luxembourg has a permanent gallery and memorial on the participation of B.U.N.C in Korea.
 There is a small museum attached to the Barracks of the 3rd Parachute Battalion, Belgian Army, in Tielen, Belgium which focuses on the Belgian participation in the Korean War.
 In 2011, The Royal Museum of the Armed Forces and of Military History in Brussels, Belgium put on a temporary exhibition entitled Belgians Can Do Too! about B.U.N.C. in Korea.

Monuments
 Twin Belgian battalion monuments exist in Brussels – on Avenue Jules César- and in South Korea -Dongducheon-si in Gyeonggi-do province.
 There is a small monument outside the Freedom Protection Museum, also in Dongducheon-si, South Korea.
 There is also a small monument outside SHAPE Headquarters in Mons, Belgium.

Notable personnel

 Michel Didisheim, later personal secretary to King Albert II
 Etienne Gailly, Bronze medal winner at the 1948 London Olympic Games served as Captain in BUNC alongside his brother Pierre.
 Pierre Francisse, 1948 London Olympic Games, track and 1960 Rome Olympic Games, Fencing (épée), was a Lieutenant in Korea. He was too severely wounded to continue his track event, and took up fencing for the Belgian Olympic team. Retired as a Colonel of the First Regiment Guides.
 Albert Guérisse was a notable member of the Belgian resistance during the Second World War. He created the Pat Line to help Allied Airmen escape capture in Nazi-Occupied Europe under the pseudonym Pat O'Leary. After serving in Korea he became the commander of the Belgian Medical Component with the rank of Major-General.
 Henri Moreau de Melen, Minister of Defence for the Christian Social Party (PSC-CVP) government who resigned his ministerial post and volunteered for service in Korea in 1950 with the rank of Major.
 Guy de Greef, a captain in B.U.N.C. and who served at the Battle of Chatkol in 1953 was the son of the Belgian Minister of Defense Eugène De Greef who held the post 1950–1954 after Moreau de Melen's resignation.
 Benoît Verhaegen, later a notable Africanist

See also
 Korean War

References

Further reading

External links

 
D'Koreaner aus dem Lëtzebuerger Land at National Museum of Military History

Military history of Belgium
Military history of Luxembourg
Korean War
United Nations contingents in Korea
History of Korea
United Nations operations in Asia
Battalions of Belgium
Military units and formations disestablished in 1955
Military units and formations established in 1950
1950 in Belgium
1950 in Luxembourg
Cold War military history of Belgium
Battalions of the Korean War